Ghost Mine is an American paranormal television series that premiered on January 16, 2013, in the United States on the Syfy channel. The series features a group of hard rock miners searching for gold in Oregon's Crescent Mine. Two paranormal investigators accompany them in an attempt to determine if the location is haunted.

On April 10, 2013, Syfy renewed the series for a 12-episode second season which premiered September 4, 2013.

On December 19, 2013, Paranormal Investigator Patrick Doyle reported via his Facebook page that Syfy had decided not to renew the show for a third season.

Premise
The series proposes that certain mines are haunted by ghosts of miners from Gold Rush days, or by spirits that superstitious miners call "Tommy-Knockers". Paranormal investigators Patrick and Kristen go into the mine first and investigate using equipment they believe can detect supernatural activity. Then it's Mine Foreman Stan's hard rock miner crew's turn to work the mine while the investigators monitor them on their DVR system in an attempt to see if they experience anything supernatural. In the end, the investigators show their evidence to the miners and state their opinions regarding the degree of supernatural activity they believe is present.

Opening introduction:

Cast and crew
Mine Owner:
Larry Overman (owner of the Crescent Mine)

Hard Rock miners:
Stan "Papa Smurf" Griffith - Mine Foreman (40 years mining experience/Griffith Exploration Corp.)
Edward "Fast Eddie" Griffith - Job Supervisor (Stan's son)
Keith "Dingus" Leingang - Drill Operator
Jared "Buckett" Anderson - Heavy Machinery Operator
Dick "Greybeard" Secord - Sample Specialist
Richard "Duck" Secord - Explosives Expert (Season 1 - Episode 1, Season 2)
Jay Verburg & Jamol Eli ("The Greenhorns") - Handymen (Jay was a former computer programmer)
Mikey Griffith - Miner
Paranormal investigators:
Patrick Doyle - Paranormal investigator (15 years experience)
Kristen Luman - Investigator (background in paranormal psychology and 10 years experience)

Episodes

Season 1 (2013)

Season 2 (2013)

Current status
As of 2013, the Crescent mine has been listed for sale with Cascade Sotheby's realty for an assessed value of $2.5 million. Larry Overman the mine owner finally placed a monument which had been planned for years, the stone was the corner stone to the original miners lodge that used to stand on the property to keep the spirit "at peace".

Syndication
In October 2016, Ghost Mine premiered on Destination America.

See also
 Apparitional experience

References

External links

 of Ghost Mine

Syfy original programming
Paranormal reality television series
2010s American documentary television series
2010s American reality television series
2013 American television series debuts
2013 American television series endings
English-language television shows
Gold mining in the United States
Mining in Oregon
Television shows set in Oregon
Television shows filmed in Oregon